The President of the Congress of Local and Regional Authorities of the Council of Europe is elected by the Congress, from among the delegates who are representatives in their delegations, on an alternating basis from each chamber (The Chamber of Local Authorities and the Chamber of Regions). The President of the Congress has a mandate of two and a half years.

The current President is Leendert Verbeek, elected on March 23, 2021.

List of presidents of the Congress of Local and Regional Authorities

Citations 

Council of Europe